Tiger Mum (Chinese: 虎妈来了) is a Singaporean family drama produced and telecast on MediaCorp Channel 8. The drama began production in November 2014. The series ran from 9 April to 6 May 2015. The show aired at 9pm on weekdays and had a repeat telecast at 8am the following day. It had a repeat in 2018 telecast  at 4.30pm to 6.30pm on weekends after succeeding Crescendo and Tiger Mum series repeated at 12pm on Tuesday to Saturday on 22 March 2022.

This is the second drama appearance of veteran actress Huang Biren since her return to the entertainment industry after a seven-year hiatus. Huang plays the title character in the show. a controlling and demanding tiger mother character. The series is sponsored by the Media Development Authority of Singapore.

With the show's viewership constantly breaking the 1 million mark, and its finale attracting more than 1.06 million viewers, Tiger Mum has been named the Top Rated Drama of Year 2015 at the recently held Star Awards 2016. This is the second consecutive time a drama starring Huang Biren (after Three Wishes in 2014) has managed to take the top viewership spot.

Plot
He Xuemei (Huang Biren) is a senior prison officer. As she is known for her stern demeanour and authoritative manner, the prisoners nicknamed her “Tigress”. Someone just has to shout “Tigress is here”, and everyone will put on their best behaviour to avoid being marked by “Tigress”. However, behind that steel veneer is a heart of gold. She cares about the prisoners, and often encourages them to improve themselves so that they will be able to earn a living upon their release from prison. Occasionally, she also helps them to resolve their personal problems. Chen Kai (Yao Wenlong) lost his wife in the early years of their marriage. He is sapped juggling between managing his career and raising four children, Huixin (Julie Tan), Haowei (Ian Fang), Haolian (Aloysius Pang), and Huiyan (Bonnie Loo), who differ markedly in character. Much as Chen Kai would like to be a good father, he is drifting apart from his children. Xuemei does not mind that Chen Kai is a father of four. Neither is Chen Kai put off by Xuemei's self-deprecating remark that she is “not pretty, not gentle and not thoughtful”. The two of them hit it off and decide to enter into a relationship with marriage in the cards. The four children resist Xuemei's intrusion into their lives and are determined to join hands to fend off “the invasion of Tiger Mum”. In the end, will Xuemei the “Tigress” win the children's hearts? Will her relationship with Chen Kai receive their blessings?

Cast

Main cast

Supporting cast

Music

Trivia
This will be Huang Biren, Yao Wenlong, Julie Tan and Jeffrey Xu's second drama collaboration since Huang's return to the entertainment industry in Three Wishes.
This will be Jaspers Lai's first villainous role.
At the end of each episode during the credits, there will be extra scenes of the show that are available for viewing on Toggle as epilogues. This is the ninth series to have no commentaries for News Tonight.
This is also Aloysius Pang and Huang Biren's second drama collaboration as mother and son after A Child's Hope in 2003.
This is also Aloysius Pang and Yao Wenlong's second drama collaboration as father and son after It Takes Two in 2012.
This is also Julie Tan and Yao Wenlong's second drama collaboration as father and daughter after Gonna Make It in 2013.
The series was repeated at 8am. 
Originally, it was slated to make its debut on 2 April 2015, but was pushed back a week later, due to National Mourning week from 23 to 29 March 2015 in lieu of the death of Lee Kuan Yew.
This series repeat its telecast on Channel 8 at 5.30pm succeeding Crescendo

International Broadcast

Malaysia Broadcast 

This series was shown on Malaysia's free-to-air channel, ntv7, on 21 May 2015 to 24 June 2015, Every Monday to Thursdays, 9:30pm to 10:30pm.

Awards & Nominations

Star Awards 2016
Tiger Mum is nominated for six awards in Star Awards 2016. The series, along with 118, Crescendo, The Dream Makers II and The Journey: Our Homeland, is one of the five dramas to be nominated for both the Best Drama Serial and Best Theme Song. The series wins two award categories: Best Screenplay and Top Rated Drama Series.It won 2 out of 6 awards.

Fame Awards 2016

See also
List of MediaCorp Channel 8 Chinese drama series (2010s)
List of Tiger Mum episodes

References

Singapore Chinese dramas
2015 Singaporean television series debuts
2015 Singaporean television series endings
Channel 8 (Singapore) original programming